This is a list of proxy wars. Major powers have been highlighted in bold.

A proxy war is defined to be "a war fought between groups of smaller countries that each represent the interests of other larger powers, and may have help and support from these".

Pre-World War I proxy wars

Inter-war period proxy wars

Cold War proxy wars

Modern proxy wars

Ongoing proxy wars

Notes

References

Proxy wars